The Khongjomnubi Nongarol, also spelt as the "Khongchomnupi Nongkalol", is an ancient Meitei literary narrative work (puya) about the six girls turning into the Pleiades in the sky.

"Khongjomnubi" or "Khongchomnupi" means the Pleiades and "Nongarol" or "Nongkalol" means the ascend to the Heaven. The work is believed to be composed during the 14th century AD.

See also
 List of Meitei folktales

Reference

Meitei literature
Puyas